The Superintendent of Bankruptcy is a Canadian government position charged to ensure that bankruptcies and insolvencies in Canada are conducted in a fair and orderly manner.

References

Federal departments and agencies of Canada
Insolvency law of Canada